Hawkins County Airport  is a county-owned public-use airport in Hawkins County, Tennessee, United States. It is located six nautical miles (7 mi, 11 km) northeast of the central business district of Rogersville, Tennessee in the city of Surgoinsville, Tennessee. This airport is included in the National Plan of Integrated Airport Systems for 2011–2015, which categorized it as a general aviation facility.

Although most U.S. airports use the same three-letter location identifier for the FAA and IATA, this airport is assigned RVN by the FAA, but has no designation from the IATA (which assigned RVN to Rovaniemi Airport in Finland).

Facilities and aircraft 
Hawkins County Airport covers an area of 56 acres (23 ha) at an elevation of 1,255 feet (383 m) above mean sea level. It has one runway designated 7/25 with an asphalt surface measuring 3,502 by 75 feet (1,067 x 23 m).

For the 12-month period ending October 22, 2009, the airport had 12,616 aircraft operations, an average of 34 per day: 98% general aviation and 2% air taxi. At that time there were 31 aircraft based at this airport: 93.5% single-engine, 3.2% multi-engine, and 3.2% helicopter.

References

External links 
 Aerial image as of March 1997 from USGS The National Map
 
 

Airports in Tennessee
Buildings and structures in Hawkins County, Tennessee
Transportation in Hawkins County, Tennessee